Amber Marie Bollinger is an American actress, producer, director, writer, and singer. She is best known for her 2014 Film, Listening.

Life and career 

Amber Marie Bollinger was born in Bellevue, Ohio where she graduated from Bellevue High School. In high school, Bollinger played volleyball, basketball, and track & field. In 2000, Bollinger won the Ohio High School Athletic Association Division 2 Girls High Jump with a jump of 5'8".  She was admitted into the Bellevue Sports Hall of Fame in 2010.

She received her BFA from The University of Cincinnati, where she earned a track & field scholarship. While majoring in 'Electronic media', she discovered her love for cinema. After graduation, she moved to Hollywood to pursue an acting career. She has appeared in many national television commercials, short films, and several feature length films. 
In 2014, she played in the Sci-Fi drama, Listening, which she received the Best Actress Award for her performance as 'Jordan' from Irvine International Film Festival. She was also noted as one of the top-5 actresses of 2015 by  'Starpulse' .

Bollinger is also the lead singer and collaborator in the band Broken Baby alongside singer-songwriter, Alex Dezen.

Works

References 

Year of birth missing (living people)
Living people
Actresses from Ohio
People from Bellevue, Ohio
American film actresses
21st-century American women